AHJ may refer to:

 Authority having jurisdiction
 Hongyuan Airport, Sichuan, China, IATA code
 AHJ (EP), by Albert Hammond, Jr.
 American Headset Jack, an audio phone connector